Schortewitz is a village and a former municipality in the district of Anhalt-Bitterfeld, in Saxony-Anhalt, Germany. Since 1 March 2009, it is part of the town Zörbig.

Former municipalities in Saxony-Anhalt
Anhalt-Bitterfeld